Bertha von Tarnóczy-Sprinzenberg (1 April 1846, Innsbruck - 6 March 1936, Pörtschach am Wörthersee) was an Austrian art teacher and painter, specializing in landscapes and still lifes.

Biography 
Her father was the court Financial Director, Karl Ludwig von Tarnóczy-Sprinzenberg and her uncle was the Archbishop (later Cardinal), Maximilian Joseph von Tarnóczy. She attended school in the convent of Sacré Coeur, Riedenburg, where she first displayed her talent for drawing. She accompanied her father on his numerous travels until 1875/76, when she took her first art lessons in Salzburg with Anton Hansch.

In 1882, she became one of the founding members of the Munich Women Artists' Association.

For personal reasons, she moved to Vienna in 1886, studied with Emil Jakob Schindler and became friends with Olga Wisinger-Florian. Later, she took several study trips to Italy and Holland and began exhibiting; notably in Salzburg and Budapest. In 1891, she received an Honorary Diploma at an exhibition in Agram (now Zagreb).

In 1901, together with Wisinger-Florian, Eugenie Breithut-Munk, Marianne von Eschenburg, Marie Egner, Marie Müller and Teresa Feoderovna Ries, she founded the group "" (Eight Women Painters) in Vienna. Later, she became one of the first members of the Austrian Association of Women Artists.

References

Further reading
 Julie M. Johnson, The Memory Factory: The Forgotten Women Artists of Vienna 1900, Purdue University Press, 2012

External links 

1846 births
1936 deaths
19th-century Austrian painters
20th-century Austrian painters
Austrian women painters
Austrian landscape painters
Artists from Innsbruck
20th-century Austrian women artists
19th-century Austrian women artists